This is a list of Old West lawmen: notable people who served in various law enforcement positions during the Old West period.

See also 
 List of Arizona Rangers
 List of cowboys and cowgirls
 List of Old West gunfighters

References

External links
Wild West Outlaws and Lawmen
Complete List of Old West Lawmen at LegendsofAmerica.com

Lists of American people by occupation
Lists of American people
People of the American Old West
American Old West-related lists